The TC America Series is a touring car racing series based in the United States. It is managed by the Stéphane Ratel Organisation and sanctioned by the United States Auto Club.

History
With the separation of classes from the Pirelli World Challenge, WC Vision and the SRO Motorsport Group created the TC America Series, for cars that previously competed in the TC / TCA / TCR categories. For the initial season of 2019, there will be 8 events with 2 40-minute races. A DSG Cup was also announced for cars equipped with DSG transmission.

References

External links
 Official website

TCR Series
Auto racing series in the United States
2019 establishments in the United States